Liang Island (Larne Island) (Foochow Romanized: Liông-dō̤, originally , Lang Tao ) is an island located in the East China Sea in Beigan Township, Lienchiang County (the Matsu Islands), Fujian Province, Republic of China (Taiwan). The island is closed to the public.

History
In a description of the island from 1843, there were three houses near the summit of Larne Island (Liang Island).

After 1949, Chinese Communist forces intermittently occupied the island.

Before dawn on July 15, 1951, Anti-Communist forces planted the flag of the ROC on the highest point of the island.

On March 17, 1965, a company of infantry was stationed on the island; the garrison has remained there to the present.

In 1966, then-Minister of National Defense Chiang Ching-kuo visited the island as part of an inspection and gave the island the name Liang Island, derived from the phrase 「」(dǎo lì tiān zhōng, liàng zhào dàlù, 'the island stands in the center of the world, illuminating the mainland').

On the morning of September 9, 2005, President Chen Shui-bian visited Liang Island and other nearby islands.

In December 2011, the ~8,000 year old Liangdao Man skeleton was found on the island. In 2014, the mitochondrial DNA of the skeleton was found to belong to Haplogroup E, with two of the four mutations characteristic of the E1 subgroup.
From this, Ko et al. infer that Haplogroup E arose 8,000 to 11,000 years ago on the north Fujian coast, traveled to Taiwan with Neolithic settlers 6,000 years ago, and thence spread to Maritime Southeast Asia with the Austronesian language dispersal.
Soares et al. caution against over-emphasizing a single sample, and maintain that a constant molecular clock implies the earlier date (and more southerly origin) remains more likely.

At 8 AM on August 16, 2019, the four man crew of a Chinese fishing ship was arrested in the waters off Liang Island.

Geography
Bays of Liang Island include Wujin-ao Bay, Liang-ao Bay, Sheng-ao Bay and Lian-ao Bay. The island's main port is Baisheng Port.

Strong winds during the winter make walking difficult.

Economy
Before 1965, fishermen would sometimes live on the island during the summer and leave when autumn started.

Gallery

See also
 Prehistory of Taiwan
 List of islands in the East China Sea
 List of islands of Taiwan
 亮島之歌  ('Liang Island Song')

References

External links

獨立特派員 387集 (我是亮島人) ('Special Correspondent #387 (I am a Liang Islander)') 

Matsu Islands
Prehistoric Taiwan